Haverholme Priory was a monastery  in Lincolnshire, England.

Foundation
In 1137, Alexander, Bishop of Lincoln offered the site of Haverholme Priory to the Cistercian monks of Fountains Abbey. After two years of construction, the order rejected the site and instead established Louth Park Abbey. Haverholme was offered to Gilbert of Sempringham and his Gilbertine order who sent nuns and brothers from Sempringham to inhabit the new buildings of what was to be a double monastery.

Gilbertine operation

The Gilbertines also inherited the responsibility for keeping the neighbouring fens drained, and to maintain a foot ferry to Sleaford across the River Slea at Ewerby Waith. They were however summoned to account in 1316 when it fell into disrepair. They were summoned again in 1360 when Alice Everingham, daughter of John de Everingham, who was supposed to have taken vows, fled from the Priory, only to be hunted down and recaptured. She complained to the Bishop of the time that she had never taken vows and she was being held against her will, so he ordered her to be released.

It is rumoured that in 1164 Thomas Becket hid at Haverholme during one of his arguments with the King.

Dissolution
Henry VIII dissolved the Priory in 1538 and it had various owners for the next two and a half centuries. It was inherited by the Finch-Hatton family. George Finch-Hatton, 10th Earl of Winchilsea and 5th Earl of Nottingham rebuilt it in 1830. It was used as a family home by the Finch-Hatton family for almost a century.

Demolition

By the early 1920s the Finch Hatton family had fallen on hard times and the priory was up for sale. It did not attract any buyers who wanted to live there. Eventually it did sell to the demolition company RUDD of Grantham. Most of the stone structure of Haverholme was sold in 1926 by RUDD to an American woman who planned to reassemble it in America. The cargo of stonework was on a dock in Liverpool when the buyer became a victim in a train crash. Eventually the stones, never shipped to America, were used to build new docks.

Present Ruin
The present ruin is the remains of a Gothic building built around 1835 to designs by the architect  Henry Edward Kendall. This was a rebuild of an earlier house dating from 1780. The ruins are now a Grade II listed building and designated Ancient Monument.

References

External links
 
 Nottingham University Library, Department of Manuscripts and Special Collections, records of Haverholme Priory
 A Page on Haverholme Priory

1139 establishments in England
Religious organizations established in the 1130s
History of Lincolnshire
Monasteries in Lincolnshire
Gilbertine nunneries
Grade II listed buildings in Lincolnshire
Christian monasteries established in the 12th century
Ruins in Lincolnshire
North Kesteven District
Monasteries dissolved under the English Reformation